Lynne Rae Perkins (born July 31, 1956) is an American writer and illustrator of children's books.

Her novel Criss Cross, winner of the 2006 Newbery Medal, is a book of vignettes, illustrations, photographs, and poems about a group of four small-town teenagers.

"Writing in a wry, omniscient third-person narrative voice, Perkins deftly captures the tentativeness and incompleteness of adolescence", said Award Committee Chair Barbara Barstow. "In 38 brief chapters, this poetic, postmodern novel experiments with a variety of styles: haiku, song lyrics, question-and-answer dialogue and split-screen scenarios. With seeming yet deliberate randomness, Perkins writes an orderly, innovative, and risk-taking book in which nothing happens and everything happens."

Perkins' picture book Home Lovely was a runner-up for the Boston Globe–Horn Book Award. Her novel All Alone in the Universe was named an ALA Notable Book, a Booklist Editor's Choice, a Bulletin Blue Ribbon Book, and a Smithsonian Magazine Notable Book for Children.

Perkins was born and raised in Cheswick, Pennsylvania, a suburb fourteen miles northeast of Pittsburgh in the Allegheny River Valley. She earned her B.A. at The Pennsylvania State University in 1978 and her M.A. from the University of Wisconsin–Milwaukee in 1981. She currently lives with her husband and two children in Suttons Bay, Michigan.

Works

 Home Lovely, (New York: Greenwillow Books, 1995)
 Clouds for Dinner, (New York: Greenwillow Books, 1997)
 All Alone in the Universe, (Scholastic Books, 2000)
 Georgie Lee, illustrator, book by Sharon Phillips Denslow, (New York: Greenwillow Books, 2002)
 The Broken Cat, (New York: Greenwillow Books, 2002)
 Snow Music, (New York: Greenwillow Books, 2003)
 Criss Cross, (New York: Greenwillow Books, 2005)
 Pictures from our Vacation, (New York: Greenwillow Books, 2007)
 The Cardboard Piano, (New York: Greenwillow Books, 2008)
 As Easy as Falling Off the Face of the Earth, (New York: Greenwillow Books, 2010)
 Seed by Seed (Illustrator), (New York: Greenwillow Books, 2012)
 Nuts to You, (New York: Greenwillow Books, 2014)
 Frank and Lucky Get Schooled, (New York: Greenwillow Book, 2016)

References

External links

 https://lynnerae.com/

 

1956 births
Living people
People from Cheswick, Pennsylvania
American children's writers
Novelists from Pennsylvania
20th-century American novelists
21st-century American novelists
20th-century American women writers
21st-century American women writers
American women children's writers
American women novelists
Pennsylvania State University alumni
University of Wisconsin–Milwaukee alumni
Newbery Medal winners